The Murder Book is a mystery novel by American author Jonathan Kellerman.

Plot introduction
During a surprise trip to Paris, Alex Delaware's girlfriend Robin announces that she will be working as part of the road crew for a rock music tour, while Alex remains at home. The split is hard on Alex, who uses the time to question his relationship with Robin as well as to start drinking heavily.

An enigmatic package arrives at Alex's house containing a photo album of violent photographs depicting victims of various cases. Labeled the Murder Book, Alex's friend, homicide detective Milo Sturgis, inspects the book and is disturbed by the image of the body of a young woman, who had been tortured, strangled and dumped. The murder was one of Milo's first cases as a rookie homicide cop.

Characters
Alex Delaware - A psychologist and Milo's best friend
Milo Sturgis - A gay Police detective who is Alex's best friend
Pierce Schwinn - A former detective who was Milo's partner
Marge Schwinn- Pierce's widow
Robin Castagna- Alex's partner
John G Broussard - Chief of Police
Bert Harrison- an old friend of Alex, a psychologist
Janie Ingalls- the girl who was murdered 
Melinda Waters- a girl who was with Janie the night she died, now an attorney
Willie Burns- a blind former junkie who witnessed the murder
Craig Bosc- a detective who messes with Milo in the investigation
Allison Gwynn- a rape victim of one of the suspects
Rick Silverman- an ER doctor and Milo's partner
Wayne Covey- a rich car repairman

2002 American novels
Novels by Jonathan Kellerman
Ballantine Books books